Nova Puppis 1673, also known as NSV 3846, is a probable nova in the constellation Puppis. It was discovered by Jean Richer on January 12, 1673 (and again observed on January 21) during the last year of an expedition Richer made to Cayenne, French Guiana. Richer measured its position on the sky using a mural quadrant, resulting in the most precise position available for a seventeenth-century nova that might be rediscovered by modern observers. At the time of its discovery the nova had a visual magnitude of 3, making it easily visible to the naked eye.

In 1987 Hilmar Duerbeck published an ESO photographic survey image, marked with the position of a 20th magnitude candidate for a modern identification of Nova Puppis 1673. However subsequent spectral observations of that potential remnant of the nova showed narrow Balmer absorption lines against a blue continuum, features which are not typically seen in quiescent novae. So Duerbeck's proposed identification could not be confirmed.

References

Novae
Puppis
1673 in science